Ralph Bosson's High Seas is a 1987 video game published by Gardé Games of Distinction.

Gameplay
Ralph Bosson's High Seas is a game in which seafaring combat from the years 1750 to 1810 is emphasized.

Reception
Bob Proctor reviewed the game for Computer Gaming World, and stated that "The overall design and flexibility of High Seas are excellent. The level of simulation and the graphics are satisfactory, but the problems with the manual and the glitches during multi-ship actions prevent me from giving it a hearty recommendation."

Reviews
Computer Gaming World - Oct, 1990

References

External links
Review in Family Computing
Review in Ahoy!

1987 video games
Apple II games
Commodore 64 games
DOS games
Ship simulation games
Turn-based strategy video games
Video games developed in the United States
Video games set in the 18th century
Video games set in the 19th century
Video games set in the 20th century